Aanakkallan is a 2018 Indian Malayalam-language comedy film directed by Suresh Divakar and written by Udaykrishna. The film stars Biju Menon, Anusree, Siddique, Suresh Krishna and Bala in the leading roles. It was produced under the banner of Saptha Tarang Cinema.

Plot
 
Esthappan  is a DySP, who has married Nancy  from a wealthy household, without the approval of her parents. He is assigned with the duty of finding the mystery behind a skeleton which was found from Ananthapuram Palace.

Pavithran, a thief claims he knows the identity of the murderer. Esthappan's wife's house is near the palace, so he sees this as an opportunity to mend his relationship with the family and solve the case with the help of Pavithran. They together attempt to figure out the identity of the murderer.

Neelima is a banker and is married to Pavithran. Aniruddhan (Pavithran's childhood friend) and Suryanarayanan (a rich builder, who is Aniruddhan's relative) convince Pavithran to start a catering unit which would yields huge profits within a year. The catering unit would have 3 partners - Aniruddhan, Pavithran and Suryanarayanan and each partner needs to invest money. Pavithran mortgages his land and house to raise the money. Both Aniruddhan and Suryanarayanan cheat Pavithranan and abscond with the money. Unable to withstand the criticism Neelima who was 6 months pregnant commits suicide.

Seeking revenge, Pavithran kills Aniruddhan and hides his body in the palace. Finally, the film end with Pavithran killing Suryanarayanan.

Cast

 Biju Menon as Pavithran
 Anusree as Neelima Kurup, Pavithran's wife
Siddique as Aana Esthappan DYSP
 Suresh Krishna as C.I Bruselee Rajan
 Bala as Suryanarayanan
Sarayu as Nancy, Thomas Esthappan wife
Shamna Kasim as Rosy Thomas 
 Hareesh Kanaran as Ishow
 Sudheer Karamana as "Goonda" Korah
 Suraj Venjaramoodu as "Kallan" Rammu
 Dharmajan Bolgatty as Darmaputran
 Indrans as Balachandran Nair, Pavithran's Uncle
 Bindu Panicker as Thresyakutty, Thomas's wife
 Sai Kumar as Paraykal Thomas
Chembil Ashokan as  Achutha Kurup
 Kailash as Aniruddhan
Anil Murali as S.I Govindan
 Priyanka as Suzy
Shivaji Guruvayoor as DGP Devarajan
G.Suresh Kumar as C.P Ramachandran, Chief Minister
Edavela Babu as Mathukutty

Music
The music for the film is composed by Nadirsha and Bijibal. Lyrics were by Rajeev Alunkal and Harinarayanan.

Release
Aanakkallan released on 18 October 2018.

Reception
The Times of India gave the film a rating of 3.0/5 and Mathrubhumi gave the film a rating of 3.5/5.

References

External links
 

2018 films
2010s Malayalam-language films
Indian comedy films
2018 comedy films